Monique Landry  (born December 25, 1937) is a former Canadian politician.

Career

Member of Parliament 
A physiotherapist and administrator, Landry was first elected to the House of Commons of Canada in the 1984 general election that brought the Progressive Conservative Party to power under the leadership of Brian Mulroney. Hers was an upset victory, defeating Liberal Cabinet minister Francis Fox.

The new Member of Parliament for Blainville—Deux-Montagnes, Quebec, was immediately appointed parliamentary secretary to the Secretary of State for Canada by Prime Minister Mulroney following the election. In 1985, she became parliamentary secretary to the Minister for International Trade.

Cabinet 
She joined the Cabinet in 1986 as both Minister for External Relations (a junior portfolio subordinate to the Secretary of State for External Affairs) and Minister responsible for La Francophonie. From 1991 to 1993, she also served as Minister of State for Indian Affairs and Northern Development while retaining her other positions.

In January 1993, she was promoted to Secretary of State for Canada. When Kim Campbell succeeded Mulroney as Prime Minister, she appointed Landry Minister of Communications in addition to her position as Secretary of State. However, both Landry and the Campbell government were defeated in the fall 1993 general election which ended her parliamentary career.

References
 

1937 births
Living people
Members of the House of Commons of Canada from Quebec
Members of the King's Privy Council for Canada
Progressive Conservative Party of Canada MPs
Women members of the House of Commons of Canada
Women in Quebec politics
Members of the 24th Canadian Ministry
Members of the 25th Canadian Ministry
20th-century Canadian women politicians
Women government ministers of Canada